Marja Heikkilä (born September 12, 1977 in Haapajärvi) is a former freestyle swimmer from Finland, who competed for her native country at the 1996 Summer Olympics in Atlanta, Georgia. There she finished in 16th place with the 4×100 m freestyle relay team, alongside Paula Harmokivi, Marja Pärssinen, and Minna Salmela.

References
 sports-reference

1977 births
Living people
Finnish female freestyle swimmers
Swimmers at the 1996 Summer Olympics
Olympic swimmers of Finland
People from Haapajärvi
Sportspeople from North Ostrobothnia